Elías Juan Pereyra (born 15 February 1999) is an Argentine professional footballer who plays as a left-back for Athens Kallithea on loan from Godoy Cruz.

Club career
Pereyra's career got underway with San Lorenzo, signing in 2007. Claudio Biaggio was the manager who gave him his debut, selecting him to start and finish a 2–2 draw with Lanús on 19 August 2018. His next appearance arrived days later in the Copa Sudamericana versus Club Nacional. After thirteen appearances for the club, Pereyra departed on loan in January 2020 to LigaPro side Benfica B. He appeared in fixtures with Leixões and C.D. Nacional before returning to San Lorenzo. On 12 August 2020, Pereyra was signed by Super League Greece club Panetolikos; he penned a three-year contract.

International career
Pereyra has previously been selected by the Argentina U20s, including to train with the senior squad in March 2018 and at the 2018 FIFA World Cup months later. In December, Pereyra was picked for the 2019 South American U-20 Championship.

Personal life
Pereyra was diagnosed with leukemia at the age of 13. After ten months of chemotherapy at Hospital Garrahan, Pereyra was cleared of the disease.

Career statistics
.

References

External links

1999 births
Living people
People from La Matanza Partido
Argentine footballers
Argentina youth international footballers
Argentina under-20 international footballers
Association football defenders
Sportspeople from Buenos Aires Province
Argentine expatriate footballers
Argentine Primera División players
Liga Portugal 2 players
Super League Greece players
San Lorenzo de Almagro footballers
S.L. Benfica B players
Panetolikos F.C. players
Godoy Cruz Antonio Tomba footballers
Argentine expatriate sportspeople in Portugal
Argentine expatriate sportspeople in Greece
Expatriate footballers in Portugal
Expatriate footballers in Greece